Rosita is a given name. Notable persons with that name include:

 Rosita Amores, Spanish singer and burlesque performer
 Rosita Arenas (born 1933), Mexican actress
 Rosita Baltazar (1960–2015), Belizean choreographer, dancer, dance instructor and director
 Rosita Barack (born 1949), Indonesian president director of Metro TV
 Rosita Bradborn (born 1973), Filipino lawn bowler
 Rosita Capuyon, Filipino beauty queen and actress
 Rosita Contreras (1913–1962), Argentine actress, singer and vedette
 Rosita Fernández (1918–2006), American singer, humanitarian, and actress
 Rosita Forbes (1890–1967), English travel writer and explorer
 Rosita van Gijlswijk (born 1974), Dutch politician
 Rosita Díaz Gimeno (1908–1986), Spanish actress
 Rosita Melo (1897–1981), Argentine-Uruguayan pianist, composer and poet
 Rosita Beatrice Missick-Butterfield (1936–2015) Turks and Caicos Islands politician
 Rosita Marstini (1887–1948), French-American actress and dancer
 Rosita Moreno (1907–1993), Spanish actress
 Rosita Quintana (born 1925), Argentina-Mexican actress and singer
 Rosita Quiroga (1896–1984), Argentine singer, lyricist and composer
 Rosita Fornés (born 1923), Cuban singer and actress
 Rosita Runegrund (born 1947), Swedish politician
 Rosita Serrano (1914–1997), Chilean singer
 Rosita Sokou (born 1923), Greek journalist, author and translator
 Rosita Vai (born 1981), New Zealand singer
 Rosita Worl (born 1938), American anthropologist
 Rosita Yarza (1922–1996), Spanish actress
 Rosita Youngblood (born 1946), American politician

Fictional characters
Rosita, one of the main characters from the film Sing

See also
 Rosa (given name)
 Rosie (given name)